John Albert Arbour (March 7, 1899 – September 24, 1973) was a Canadian ice hockey defenceman who played for several teams in a variety of leagues between 1922 and 1938. The younger brother of Ty Arbour, he did not repeat his older brother's success in the National Hockey League, and managed only 47 games over 2 seasons with the Detroit Cougars and Toronto Maple Leafs. He finished his NHL career in 1938 with 5 goals and one assist.

Career statistics

Regular season and playoffs

External links

1899 births
1973 deaths
Calgary Tigers players
Canadian expatriate ice hockey players in the United States
Canadian ice hockey defencemen
Detroit Cougars players
Detroit Olympics (CPHL) players
Ice hockey people from Simcoe County
London Panthers players
North West Hockey League players
Portland Buckaroos players
Seattle Metropolitans players
Spokane Clippers players
Toronto Maple Leafs players
Western Canada Hockey League players
Windsor Bulldogs (1929–1936) players
Windsor Bulldogs (CPHL) players